Nikola Kolarov (born 14 March 1983) is a Serbian former professional footballer who played as a defender. He is the older brother of Serbia international Aleksandar Kolarov.

References

External links
 
 
 
 

Association football defenders
Expatriate footballers in Bosnia and Herzegovina
Expatriate footballers in Poland
First League of Serbia and Montenegro players
FK Borac Banja Luka players
FK Čukarički players
FK Hajduk Beograd players
FK Inđija players
FK Mačva Šabac players
FK Olimpik players
FK Srem Jakovo players
Footballers from Belgrade
KSZO Ostrowiec Świętokrzyski players
Premier League of Bosnia and Herzegovina players
Serbia and Montenegro footballers
Serbian expatriate footballers
Serbian expatriate sportspeople in Bosnia and Herzegovina
Serbian expatriate sportspeople in Poland
Serbian First League players
Serbian footballers
1983 births
Living people